Retracement in finance is a complete or partial reversal of the price of a security or a derivative from its current trend, thereby creating a temporary counter-trend. Not to be confused with Fibonacci Retracement, market correction and/or market reversal, which are the most popular types of retracements.

References
As used by journalists:

http://www.marketwatch.com/story/trust-the-streak-this-is-more-than-just-some-bear-market-rally-2016-03-21
http://www.chicagotribune.com/news/sns-wp-blm-currency-comment-8c2c2374-f0ff-11e5-a2a3-d4e9697917d1-20160323-story.html
https://www.cnbc.com/2016/03/21/is-the-pain-trade-still-higher.html

Financial markets